is a park located in Yokosuka, Kanagawa, Japan.

Facilities 
 Battleship Mikasa
 Statue of Tōgō Heihachirō
 Ammunition of Battleship Yamato
 Gunkan kōshinkyoku monument
 Fountains

Mikasa Park's main attractions are the memorial pre-dreadnought battleship Mikasa, its multicolored fountain complex, and ammo from the Yamato. There's also a monument of the Gunkan kōshinkyoku navy march song. The park is among Japan's Top 100 City Parks.  can be seen from most locations in the park.

Hours 
 8:00am – 9:00pm April - October 
9am - 8pm November - March

Transportation 
 From Yokosuka-Chūō Station (Keikyu) : approx. 15 min by foot.
 From Yokosuka Station (JR Yokosuka Line) : approx. 30 min by foot.

Gallery

External links

 Information 

Yokosuka, Kanagawa
Parks and gardens in Kanagawa Prefecture